Ağbulaq (also, Ag-Bulag and Agbulak) is a village and municipality in the Ismailli Rayon of Azerbaijan.  It has a population of 372.

References 

Populated places in Ismayilli District